The Northern Mountain Range is a geographical region in northern Albania. It is one of the four main regions of Albania, the others being Central Mountain Range, Southern Mountain Range, and Western Lowlands. The northern range encompasses the Albanian Alps extending from the Lake Shkodër shared with Montenegro in the northwest through the Valbonë Valley to the Drin Valley in the east. The area falls within the Dinaric Mountains mixed forests and Balkan mixed forests terrestrial ecoregions of the Palearctic Temperate broadleaf and mixed forests.

Inside the Northern Mountain Range, there are two national parks and a nature reserve, namely Theth National Park, Valbonë Valley National Park and Gashi River Nature Reserve. The International Union for Conservation of Nature (IUCN) has listed the nature reserve as Category I, while the national parks as Category II. In 2017, the Gashi River was declared a UNESCO World Heritage Site as part of the Primeval beech forests of the Carpathians and other regions of Europe.

Geology

Albanian Alps 

The composition of the great tectonic units reflects the history of the formation of the Albanian Alps. The Albanian Alps (Bjeshkët e Nemuna or Prokletije) are the southernmost and highest part of the Dinaric Alps.

See also 
 Gashi River Nature Reserve
 Gashi River part of Primeval beech forests of the Carpathians and other regions of Europe
 Theth National Park
 Valbonë Valley National Park

References 

 

Geography of Albania